You Just Gotta Love Christmas (2004) is the eighth and final solo album by musician Peter Cetera, his seventh since leaving the group Chicago, his only Christmas album.  This album featured some artwork by Cetera's youngest daughter Senna, and his oldest daughter Claire performs with him on "Blue Christmas" and "Winter Wonderland". Alison Krauss performs with Cetera on "Deck the Halls". In a 2017 article, writer David White listed the album among his list of sixteen "essential classic rock Christmas albums."

Track listing
 "Let It Snow" (Sammy Cahn, Jule Styne) – 2:59
 "Christmas Song" (Mel Tormé, Robert Wells) – 3:36
 "Santa Claus Is Coming to Town" (J. Fred Coots, Haven Gillespie) – 3:10
 "Blue Christmas" (with Claire Cetera) (Billy Hays, Jay Johnson) – 3:19
 "Deck The Halls" (with Alison Krauss) (traditional - Peter Cetera, Tony Harrell) – 3:10
 "I'll Be Home for Christmas" (Buck Ram, Walter Kent, Kim Gannon) – 2:40
 "You Just Gotta Love Christmas" (Cetera, Harrell) – 3:17
 "Jingle Bells" (traditional - Cetera, Harrell) – 3:36
 "God Rest Ye Merry Gentlemen" (traditional - Cetera, Harrell) – 3:01
 "Winter Wonderland" (with Claire Cetera) (Felix Bernard, Richard B. Smith) – 2:57
 "Something that Santa Claus Left Behind" (Cetera, Harrell) – 3:56
 "Alone for the Holidays" (Cetera, Harrell) – 3:58

Personnel 
 Peter Cetera – lead and backing vocals, bass
 Tony Harrell – keyboards, programming
 Tom Bukovac – guitars
 Bruce Gaitsch – guitars
 Kenny Greenberg – guitars
 B. James Lowry – guitars
 Jerry McPherson – guitars
 Mike Brignardello – bass
 Craig Nelson – bass
 Jimmie Lee Sloas – bass
 Glenn Worf – bass
 Greg Morrow – drums, additional programming
 Eric Darken – percussion
 Jack Gavin – congas
 Kirk "JellyRoll" Johnson – harmonica
 Jim Horn – saxophones, sax solos
 Chris Dunn – trombone
 Ben Strano – trombone, trumpet solos
 Steve Herrman – trumpet
 John Mock – pipes, buron, penny whistle
 Chris Carmichael – strings
 Claire Cetera – backing vocals on "Blue Christmas" and "Winter Wonderland"
 Alison Krauss – backing vocals on "Deck The Halls"

Production 
 Produced, Written and Arranged by Peter Cetera and Tony Harrell.
 Recorded and Mixed at The Hum Depot (Nashville, TN).
 Recording Engineer – Ben Strano
 Additional Engineering – Chuck Bracco and Scott Velasco
 Mixed by Joe Hardy
 Mastered by Mark Chevalier and Jim Demain at Yes Master (Nashville, TN).
 Package Art and Design – Vickey Hanson 
 Inside Artwork – Senna Cetera

References

Peter Cetera albums
2004 Christmas albums
Christmas albums by American artists
Rock Christmas albums